Marcel Pușcaș (born 12 October 1960) is a Romanian former football midfielder and manager.

Career
Marcel Pușcaș started his football career in his native Oradea at FC Bihor. In 1983 he was transferred to Steaua București, where he won one league title for which he contributed with 2 goals scored in 21 appearances and one cup, also playing two games in the 1984–85 European Cup Winners' Cup against A.S. Roma. In 1985, Pușcaș left Steaua to play for Rapid București, where in a match against Politehnica Timișoara, he had his leg broken by Marcel Sabou, a injury that kept him off the field for about two years. After he recovered from the injury, Pușcaș played a few matches Rapid, after which he went to second division club CS Târgoviște where he was a player-coach. He ended his playing career at Steaua Mizil. Pușcaș graduated the National University of Physical Education and Sport (ANEFS) and the University of Mechanics. In 1993 Pușcaș was coach at Rapid București, managing to qualify the team in European competitions for the first time after 18 years, leading the team in the double defeat against Inter Milan in the 1993–94 UEFA Cup. After his experience as coach at Rapid, Pușcaș abandoned his coaching career at started his career as a football official at AJF Bihor, after which he became president at Viitorul Oradea. From 1996 until 1998 he was president at Steaua București, a period in which the club won two league titles, one cup and one supercup. From 2002 until 2004 he worked as a sports agent. In March 2014 Pușcaș ran for president of the Romanian Football Federation, but gave up his candidacy during the General Assembly of the elections in order to support Răzvan Burleanu, who would eventually win the elections and Pușcaș was co-opted into Burleanu's administrative team at the federation. In April 2018 Pușcaș ran again for president of the Romanian Football Federation, this time losing in favor of Răzvan Burleanu. From November 2018 until July 2020, he was president at FC U Craiova 1948, a period in which the club won a promotion to the second league. On 27 October 2020, Marcel Pușcaș released a autobiographical book called Fotbalul în cârje (Football on crutches). On 26 March 2021 he released his second book called Cum devii fotbalist (How do you become a footballer).

International career
Marcel Pușcaș played one friendly game at international level for Romania, being used by coach Mircea Lucescu to replace Aurel Țicleanu in the 72nd minute of a 1–0 victory against East Germany.

Honours
Bihor Oradea
Divizia B: 1981–82
Steaua București
Divizia A: 1984–85
Cupa României: 1984–85

References

1960 births
Living people
Romanian footballers
Romania international footballers
Association football midfielders
Liga I players
Liga II players
FC Bihor Oradea players
FC Steaua București players
FC Rapid București players
FCM Târgoviște players
Sportspeople from Oradea
Romanian football managers
FCM Târgoviște managers
FC Rapid București managers
Association football agents
Romanian sports executives and administrators
Romanian writers
21st-century Romanian writers
Romanian male writers
21st-century Romanian male writers